Alfred Adler (7 February 1870 – 28 May 1937) was an Austrian medical doctor, psychotherapist, and founder of the school of individual psychology. His emphasis on the importance of feelings of belonging, family constellation and birth order set him apart from Freud and other members of the Vienna Circle. He proposed that contributing to others (Social Interest or ) was how the individual feels a sense of worth and belonging in the family and society. His earlier work focused on inferiority, the inferiority complex, an isolating element which plays a key role in personality development. 
Alfred Adler considered a human being as an individual whole, and therefore he called his psychology "Individual Psychology" (Orgler 1976).

Adler was the first to emphasize the importance of the social element in the re-adjustment process of the individual and to carry psychiatry into the community. A Review of General Psychology survey, published in 2002, ranked Adler as the 67th most eminent psychologist of the 20th century.

Early life 
Alfred Adler was born on February 7, 1870 at Mariahilfer Straße 208 in Rudolfsheim, a village on the western fringes of Vienna, a modern part of Rudolfsheim-Fünfhaus, the 15th district of the city. He was second of the seven children of a Jewish couple, Pauline (Beer) and Leopold Adler. Leopold Adler was a Hungarian-born grain merchant. Alfred's younger brother died in the bed next to him when Alfred was only three years old, and throughout his childhood, he maintained a rivalry with his older brother. This rivalry was spurred on because Adler believed his mother preferred his brother over him. Despite his good relationship with his father, he still struggled with feelings of inferiority in his relationship with his mother.

Alfred was an active, popular child and an average student who was also known for the competitive attitude toward his older brother, Sigmund. Early on, he developed rickets, which kept Alfred from walking until he was four years old. At the age of four, he developed pneumonia and heard a doctor say to his father, "Your boy is lost". Along with being run over twice and witnessing his younger brother's death, this sickness contributed to his overall fear of death. At that point, he decided to be a physician. He was very interested in the subjects of psychology, sociology and philosophy. After studying at University of Vienna, he specialized as an eye doctor, and later in neurology and psychiatry.

Career 
Adler began his medical career as an ophthalmologist, but he soon switched to general practice, and established his office in a less affluent part of Vienna across from the Prater, a combination of amusement park and circus. His clients included circus people, and it has been suggested that the unusual strengths and weaknesses of the performers led to his insights into "organ inferiorities" and "compensation".

In his early career, Adler wrote an article in the defense of Freud's theory after reading one of Freud's most well known works, The Interpretation of Dreams. In 1902, because of his defense article, Adler received an invitation from Sigmund Freud to join an informal discussion group that included Rudolf Reitler and Wilhelm Stekel. The group, the "Wednesday Society", met regularly on Wednesday evenings at Freud's home and was the beginning of the psychoanalytic movement, expanding over time to include many more members. Each week a member would present a paper and after a short break of coffee and cakes, the group would discuss it. The main members were Otto Rank, Max Eitingon, Wilhelm Stekel, Karl Abraham, Hanns Sachs, Fritz Wittels, Max Graf, and Sandor Ferenczi. In 1908, Adler presented his paper, "The aggressive instinct in life and in neurosis", at a time when Freud believed that early sexual development was the primary determinant of the making of character, with which Adler took issue. Adler proposed that the sexual and aggressive drives were "two originally separate instincts which merge later on". Freud at the time disagreed with this idea.

When Freud in 1920 proposed his dual instinct theory of libido and aggressive drives in Beyond the Pleasure Principle, without citing Adler, he was reproached that Adler had proposed the aggressive drive in his 1908 paper (Eissler, 1971). Freud later commented in a 1923 footnote he added to the Little Hans case that, "I have myself been obliged to assert the existence of an aggressive instinct" (1909, p. 140, 2), while pointing out that his conception of an aggressive drive differs from that of Adler. A long-serving member of the group, he made many more beyond this 1908 pivotal contribution to the group, and Adler became president of the Vienna Psychoanalytic Society eight years later (1910). He remained a member of the Society until 1911, when he and a group of his supporters formally disengaged from Freud's circle, the first of the great dissenters from orthodox psychoanalysis (preceding Carl Jung's split in 1914).

This departure suited both Freud and Adler, since they had grown to dislike each other. During his association with Freud, Adler frequently maintained his own ideas which often diverged from Freud's. While Adler is often referred to as "a pupil of Freud", in fact this was never true; they were colleagues, Freud referring to him in print in 1909 as "My colleague Dr Alfred Adler". The association of Adler and Freud lasted a total of 9 years, and they never saw each other after the separation. Freud continued to dislike Adler even after the separation and tended to do so with other defectors from psychoanalysis. Even after Adler's death, Freud maintained his distaste for him. When conversing with a colleague over the matter, he stated, "I don't understand your sympathy for Adler. For a Jewish boy out of a Viennese suburb a death in Aberdeen is an unheard of career in itself and a proof of how far he had got on. The world really rewarded him richly for his service in having contradicted psychoanalysis." In 1929 Adler showed a reporter with the New York Herald a copy of the faded postcard that Freud had sent him in 1902. He wanted to prove that he had never been a disciple of Freud's but rather that Freud had sought him out to share his ideas.

Adler founded the Society for Individual Psychology in 1912 after his break from the psychoanalytic movement. Adler's group initially included some orthodox Nietzschean adherents (who believed that Adler's ideas on power and inferiority were closer to Nietzsche than Freud's). Their enmity aside, Adler retained a lifelong admiration for Freud's ideas on dreams and credited him with creating a scientific approach to their clinical utilization (Fiebert, 1997). Nevertheless, even regarding dream interpretation, Adler had his own theoretical and clinical approach. The primary differences between Adler and Freud centered on Adler's contention that the social realm (exteriority) is as important to psychology as is the internal realm (interiority). The dynamics of power and compensation extend beyond sexuality, and gender and politics can be as important as libido. Moreover, Freud did not share Adler's socialist beliefs, the latter's wife being for example an intimate friend of many of the Russian Marxists such as Leon Trotsky.

The Adlerian school 
Following Adler's break from Freud, he enjoyed considerable success and celebrity in building an independent school of psychotherapy and a unique personality theory. He traveled and lectured for a period of 25 years promoting his socially oriented approach. His intent was to build a movement that would rival, even supplant, others in psychology by arguing for the holistic integrity of psychological well-being with that of social equality. Adler's efforts were halted by World War I, during which he served as a doctor with the Austro-Hungarian Army. After the conclusion of the war, his influence increased greatly. In the 1920s, he established a number of child guidance clinics. From 1921 onwards, he was a frequent lecturer in Europe and the United States, becoming a visiting professor at Columbia University in 1927. His clinical treatment methods for adults were aimed at uncovering the hidden purpose of symptoms using the therapeutic functions of insight and meaning.

Adler was concerned with the overcoming of the superiority/inferiority dynamic and was one of the first psychotherapists to discard the analytic couch in favor of two chairs. This allows the clinician and patient to sit together more or less as equals. Clinically, Adler's methods are not limited to treatment after-the-fact but extend to the realm of prevention by preempting future problems in the child. Prevention strategies include encouraging and promoting social interest, belonging, and a cultural shift within families and communities that leads to the eradication of pampering and neglect (especially corporal punishment). Adler's popularity was related to the comparative optimism and comprehensibility of his ideas. He often wrote for the lay public. Adler always retained a pragmatic approach that was task-oriented. These "Life tasks" are occupation/work, society/friendship, and love/sexuality. Their success depends on cooperation. The tasks of life are not to be considered in isolation since, as Adler famously commented, "they all throw cross-lights on one another".

In his bestselling book, Man's Search for Meaning, Dr. Viktor E. Frankl compared his own "Third Viennese School of Psychotherapy" (after Freud's and Adler's schools) to Adler's analysis:

Emigration 
In the early 1930s, after most of Adler's Austrian clinics had been closed due to his Jewish heritage (despite his conversion to Christianity), Adler left Austria for a professorship at the Long Island College of Medicine in the US. Adler died from a heart attack in 1937 in Aberdeen, Scotland, during a lecture tour. (His remains went missing and were unaccounted for until 2007.) His death was a temporary blow to the influence of his ideas, although a number of them were subsequently taken up by neo-Freudians. Through the work of Rudolf Dreikurs in the United States and many other adherents worldwide, Adlerian ideas and approaches remain strong and viable more than 80 years after Adler's death.

Around the world there are various organizations promoting Adler's orientation towards mental and social well-being. These include the International Committee of Adlerian Summer Schools and Institutes (ICASSI), the North American Society of Adlerian Psychology (NASAP) and the International Association for Individual Psychology. Teaching institutes and programs exist in Austria, Canada, England, Germany, Greece, Israel, Italy, Japan, Latvia, Switzerland, the United States, Jamaica, Peru, and Wales.

Basic principles 
Adler was influenced by the mental construct ideas of the philosopher Hans Vaihinger (The Philosophy of 'As if') and the literature of Dostoyevsky. While still a member of the Vienna Psychoanalytic Society he developed a theory of organic inferiority and compensation that was the prototype for his later turn to phenomenology and the development of his famous concept, the inferiority complex.

Adler was also influenced by the philosophies of Immanuel Kant, Friedrich Nietzsche, Rudolf Virchow and the statesman Jan Smuts (who coined the term "holism"). Adler's School, known as "Individual Psychology"—an arcane reference to the Latin individuals meaning indivisibility, a term intended to emphasize holism—is both a social and community psychology as well as a depth psychology. Adler was an early advocate in psychology for prevention and emphasized the training of parents, teachers, social workers and so on in democratic approaches that allow a child to exercise their power through reasoned decision making whilst co-operating with others. He was a social idealist, and was known as a socialist in his early years of association with psychoanalysis (1902–1911).

Adler was pragmatic and believed that lay people could make practical use of the insights of psychology. Adler was also an early supporter of feminism in psychology and the social world, believing that feelings of superiority and inferiority were often gendered and expressed symptomatically in characteristic masculine and feminine styles. These styles could form the basis of psychic compensation and lead to mental health difficulties. Adler also spoke of "safeguarding tendencies" and neurotic behavior long before Anna Freud wrote about the same phenomena in her book The Ego and the Mechanisms of Defense.

Adlerian-based scholarly, clinical and social practices focus on the following topics:
 Social interest and community feeling
 Holism and the creative self
 Fictional finalism, teleology, and goal constructs
 Psychological and social encouragement
 Inferiority, superiority and compensation
 Life style/style of life
 Early recollections (a projective technique)
 Family constellation and birth order
 Life tasks and social embeddedness
 The conscious and unconscious realms
 Private logic and common sense (based in part on Kant's "")
 Symptoms and neurosis
 Safeguarding behavior
 Guilt and guilt feelings
 Socratic questioning
 Dream interpretation
 Child and adolescent psychology
 Democratic approaches to parenting and families
 Adlerian approaches to classroom management
 Leadership and organizational psychology

Adler created Adlerian Therapy, because he believed that one's psyche should be studied in the context of that person's environment.

Adler's approach to personality 
In one of his earliest and most famous publications, "Study of Organ Inferiority and Its Psychical Compensation," Adler outlined the basics for what would be the beginning foundation of his personality theory. The article focuses mainly on the topics of organ inferiority and compensation. Organ inferiority is when one organ, or portion of the body, is weaker than the rest. Adler postulated that the body's other organs would work together in order to compensate for the weakness of this "inferior" organ. When compensation occurs, other areas of the body make up for the function lacking in the inferior portion. In some cases, the weakness may be overcompensated transforming it into a strength. An example would be an individual with a weak leg becoming a great runner later on. As his theory progressed, the idea of organ inferiority was replaced with feelings of inferiority instead. As Adler's theory progressed, he continued evolving his theory and key ideas.

Adler's book,  (The Neurotic Character) defines his earlier key ideas. He argued that human personality could be explained teleologically: parts of the individual's unconscious self ideally work to convert feelings of inferiority to superiority (or rather completeness). The desires of the self ideal were countered by social and ethical demands. If the corrective factors were disregarded and the individual overcompensated, then an inferiority complex would occur, fostering the danger of the individual becoming egocentric, power-hungry and aggressive or worse.

Common therapeutic tools include the use of humor, historical instances, and paradoxical injunctions.

Psychodynamics and teleology 
Adler maintained that human psychology is psychodynamic in nature. Unlike Freud's metapsychology that emphasizes instinctual demands, human psychology is guided by goals and fueled by a yet unknown creative force. Like Freud's instincts, Adler's fictive goals are largely unconscious. These goals have a "teleological" function. Constructivist Adlerians, influenced by neo-Kantian and Nietzschean ideas, view these "teleological" goals as "fictions" in the sense that Hans Vaihinger spoke of (fictio). Usually there is a fictional final goal which can be deciphered alongside of innumerable sub-goals. The inferiority/superiority dynamic is constantly at work through various forms of compensation and overcompensation. For example, in anorexia nervosa the fictive final goal is to "be perfectly thin" (overcompensation on the basis of a feeling of inferiority). Hence, the fictive final goal can serve a persecutory function that is ever-present in subjectivity (though its trace springs are usually unconscious). The end goal of being "thin" is fictive, however, since it can never be subjectively achieved.

Teleology serves another vital function for Adlerians. Chilon's "hora telos" ("see the end, consider the consequences") provides for both healthy and maladaptive psychodynamics. Here we also find Adler's emphasis on personal responsibility in mentally healthy subjects who seek their own and the social good.

Constructivism and metaphysics 
The metaphysical thread of Adlerian theory does not problematize the notion of teleology since concepts such as eternity (an ungraspable end where time ceases to exist) match the religious aspects that are held in tandem. In contrast, the constructivist Adlerian threads (either humanist/modernist or postmodern in variant) seek to raise insight of the force of unconscious fictions– which carry all of the inevitability of 'fate'– so long as one does not understand them. Here, 'teleology' itself is fictive yet experienced as quite real. This aspect of Adler's theory is somewhat analogous to the principles developed in Rational Emotive Behavior Therapy (REBT) and Cognitive Therapy (CT). Both Albert Ellis and Aaron T. Beck credit Adler as a major precursor to REBT and CT. Ellis in particular was a member of the North American Society for Adlerian Psychology and served as an editorial board member for the Adlerian Journal Individual Psychology.

As a psychodynamic system, Adlerians excavate the past of a client/patient in order to alter their future and increase integration into community in the 'here-and-now'. The 'here-and-now' aspects are especially relevant to those Adlerians who emphasize humanism and/or existentialism in their approaches.

Holism 
Metaphysical Adlerians emphasize a spiritual holism in keeping with what Jan Smuts articulated (Smuts coined the term "holism"), that is, the spiritual sense of one-ness that holism usually implies (etymology of holism: from ὅλος holos, a Greek word meaning all, entire, total)  Smuts believed that evolution involves a progressive series of lesser wholes integrating into larger ones. Whilst Smuts' text Holism and Evolution is thought to be a work of science, it actually attempts to unify evolution with a higher metaphysical principle (holism). The sense of connection and one-ness revered in various religious traditions (among these, Christianity, Judaism, Zoroastrianism, Islam, Buddhism and Baha'i) finds a strong complement in Adler's thought.

The pragmatic and materialist aspects to contextualizing members of communities, the construction of communities and the socio-historical-political forces that shape communities matter a great deal when it comes to understanding an individual's psychological make-up and functioning. This aspect of Adlerian psychology holds a high level of synergy with the field of community psychology, especially given Adler's concern for what he called "the absolute truth and logic of communal life". However, Adlerian psychology, unlike community psychology, is holistically concerned with both prevention and clinical treatment after-the-fact. Hence, Adler can be considered the "first community psychologist", a discourse that formalized in the decades following Adler's death (King & Shelley, 2008).

Adlerian psychology, Carl Jung's analytical psychology, Gestalt therapy and Karen Horney's psychodynamic approach are holistic schools of psychology. These discourses eschew a reductive approach to understanding human psychology and psychopathology.

Typology 
Adler developed a scheme of so-called personality types, which were however always to be taken as provisional or heuristic since he did not, in essence, believe in personality types, and at different times proposed different and equally tentative systems. The danger with typology is to lose sight of the individual's uniqueness and to gaze reductively, acts that Adler opposed. Nevertheless, he intended to illustrate patterns that could denote a characteristic governed under the overall style of life. Hence American Adlerians such as Harold Mosak have made use of Adler's typology in this provisional sense:
 The Getting or Leaning They are sensitive people who have developed a shell around themselves which protects them, but they must rely on others to carry them through life's difficulties. They have low energy levels and so become dependent. When overwhelmed, they develop what we typically think of as neurotic symptoms: phobias, obsessions and compulsions, general anxiety, hysteria, amnesias, and so on, depending on individual details of their lifestyle.
 The Avoiding types are those that hate being defeated. They may be successful, but have not taken any risks getting there. They are likely to have low social contact in fear of rejection or defeat in any way.
 The Ruling or Dominant type strive for power and are willing to manipulate situations and people, anything to get their way. People of this type are also prone to anti-social behavior.
 The Socially Useful types are those who are very outgoing and very active. They have a lot of social contact and strive to make changes for the good.

These 'types' are typically formed in childhood and are expressions of the Style of Life.

The importance of memories 
Adler placed great emphasis upon the interpretation of early memories in working with patients and school children, writing that, "Among all psychic expressions, some of the most revealing are the individual's memories." Adler viewed memories as expressions of "private logic" and as metaphors for an individual's personal philosophy of life or "lifestyle". He maintained that memories are never incidental or trivial; rather, they are chosen reminders: "(A person's) memories are the reminders she carries about with her of her limitations and of the meanings of events. There are no 'chance' memories. Out of the incalculable number of impressions that an individual receives, she chooses to remember only those which she considers, however dimly, to have a bearing on her problems."

On birth order 
Adler often emphasized one's psychological birth order as having an influence on the style of life and the strengths and weaknesses in one's psychological make up. Birth order referred to the placement of siblings within the family. It is important to note the difference between psychological and ordinal birth order (e.g. in some families, a second child might behave like a firstborn, in which case they are considered to be an ordinal secondborn but a psychological firstborn). Mosak, H.H. & Maniacci, M. P. (1999). A primer of Adlerian Psychology. Taylor and Francis. Adler believed that the firstborn child would be in a favorable position, enjoying the full attention of the eager new parents until the arrival of a second child. This second child would cause the first born to suffer feelings of dethronement, no longer being the center of attention. Adler (1908) believed that in a three-child family, the oldest child would be the most likely to suffer from neuroticism and substance addiction which he reasoned was a compensation for the feelings of excessive responsibility "the weight of the world on one's shoulders" (e.g. having to look after the younger ones) and the melancholic loss of that once supremely pampered position. As a result, he predicted that this child was the most likely to end up in jail or an asylum. Youngest children would tend to be overindulged, leading to poor social empathy. Consequently, the middle child, who would experience neither dethronement nor overindulgence, was most likely to develop into a successful individual yet also most likely to be a rebel and to feel squeezed-out. Adler himself was the third (some sources credit second) in a family of six children.

Adler never produced any scientific support for his interpretations on birth order roles, nor did he feel the need to. Yet the value of the hypothesis was to extend the importance of siblings in marking the psychology of the individual beyond Freud's more limited emphasis on the mother and father. Hence, Adlerians spend time therapeutically mapping the influence that siblings (or lack thereof) had on the psychology of their clients. The idiographic approach entails an excavation of the phenomenology of one's birth order position for likely influence on the subject's Style of Life. In sum, the subjective experiences of sibling positionality and inter-relations are important in terms of the dynamics of psychology, for Adlerian therapists and personality theorists, not the cookbook predictions that may or may not have been objectively true in Adler's time.

For Adler, birth order answered the question, "Why do children, who are raised in the same family, grow up with very different personalities?" While a strict geneticist, believing siblings are raised in a shared environment, may claim any differences in personality would be caused by subtle variations in the individuals' genetics, Adler showed through his birth order theory that children do not grow up in the same shared environment, but the oldest child grows up in a family where they have younger siblings, the middle child with older and younger siblings, and the youngest with older siblings. The position in the family constellation, Adler said, is the reason for these differences in personality and not genetics: a point later taken up by Eric Berne.

On addiction 
Adler's insight into birth order, compensation and issues relating to the individuals' perception of community also led him to investigate the causes and treatment of substance abuse disorders, particularly alcoholism and morphinism, which already were serious social problems of his time. Adler's work with addicts was significant since most other prominent proponents of psychoanalysis invested relatively little time and thought into these widespread ills of the modern and post-modern age. In addition to applying his individual psychology approach of organ inferiority, for example, to the onset and causes of addictive behaviors, he also tried to find a clear relationship of drug cravings to sexual gratification or their substitutions. Early pharmaco-therapeutic interventions with non-addictive substances, such as neuphyllin were used, since withdrawal symptoms were explained by a form of "water-poisoning" that made the use of diuretics necessary.

Adler and his wife's pragmatic approach, and the seemingly high success rates of their treatment were based on their ideas of social functioning and well-being. Clearly, life style choices and situations were emphasized, for example the need for relaxation or the negative effects of early childhood conflicts were examined, which compared to other authoritarian or religious treatment regimens, were clearly modern approaches. Certainly some of his observations, for example that psychopaths were more likely to be drug addicts are not compatible with current methodologies and theories of substance abuse treatment, but the self-centered attributes of the illness and the clear escapism from social responsibilities by pathological addicts put Adler's treatment modalities clearly into a modern contextual reasoning.

On homosexuality 

Adler's ideas regarding non-heterosexual sexuality and various social forms of deviance have long been controversial. Along with prostitution and criminality, Adler had classified 'homosexuals' as falling among the "failures of life". In 1917, he began his writings on homosexuality with a 52-page magazine, and sporadically published more thoughts throughout the rest of his life.

The Dutch psychologist Gerard J. M. van den Aardweg underlines how Alfred Adler came to his conclusions for, in 1917, Adler believed that he had established a connection between homosexuality and an inferiority complex towards one's own gender. This point of view differed from Freud's theory that homosexuality is rooted in narcissism or Jung's view of expressions of contrasexuality vis-à-vis the archetypes of the Anima and Animus.

There is evidence that Adler may have moved towards abandoning the hypothesis. Towards the end of Adler's life, in the mid-1930s, his opinion towards homosexuality began to shift. Elizabeth H. McDowell, a New York state family social worker recalls undertaking supervision with Adler on a young man who was "living in sin" with an older man in New York City. Adler asked her, "Is he happy, would you say?" "Oh yes," McDowell replied. Adler then stated, "Well, why don't we leave him alone."

According to Phyllis Bottome, who wrote Adler's Biography (after Adler himself laid upon her that task): "He always treated homosexuality as lack of courage. These were but ways of obtaining a slight release for a physical need while avoiding a greater obligation. A transient partner of your own sex is a better known road and requires less courage than a permanent contact with an "unknown" sex.... Adler taught that men cannot be judged from within by their "possessions," as he used to call nerves, glands, traumas, drives et cetera, since both judge and prisoner are liable to misconstrue what is invisible and incalculable; but that he can be judged, with no danger from introspection, by how he measures up to the three common life tasks set before every human being between the cradle and the grave: work (employment), love or marriage (intimacy), and social contact (friendships.)"

Parent education 
Adler emphasized both treatment and prevention. With regard to psychodynamic psychology, Adlerians emphasize the foundational importance of childhood in developing personality and any tendency towards various forms of psychopathology. The best way to inoculate against what are now termed "personality disorders" (what Adler had called the "neurotic character"), or a tendency to various neurotic conditions (depression, anxiety, etc.), is to train a child to be and feel an equal part of the family. The responsibility of the optimal development of the child is not limited to the mother or father, but rather includes teachers and society more broadly. Adler argued therefore that teachers, nurses, social workers, and so on require training in parent education to complement the work of the family in fostering a democratic character. When a child does not feel equal and is enacted upon (abused through pampering or neglect) he or she is likely to develop inferiority or superiority complexes and various concomitant compensation strategies. These strategies exact a social toll by seeding higher divorce rates, the breakdown of the family, criminal tendencies, and subjective suffering in the various guises of psychopathology. Adlerians have long promoted parent education groups, especially those influenced by the famous Austrian/American Adlerian Rudolf Dreikurs (Dreikurs & Soltz, 1964).

Spirituality, ecology and community 
In a late work, Social Interest: A Challenge to Mankind (1938), Adler turns to the subject of metaphysics, where he integrates Jan Smuts' evolutionary holism with the ideas of teleology and community: "sub specie aeternitatis". Unabashedly, he argues his vision of society: "Social feeling means above all a struggle for a communal form that must be thought of as eternally applicable... when humanity has attained its goal of perfection... an ideal society amongst all mankind, the ultimate fulfillment of evolution." Adler follows this pronouncement with a defense of metaphysics:

This social feeling for Adler is Gemeinschaftsgefühl, a community feeling whereby one feels he or she belongs with others and has also developed an ecological connection with nature (plants, animals, the crust of this earth) and the cosmos as a whole, sub specie aeternitatis. Clearly, Adler himself had little problem with adopting a metaphysical and spiritual point of view to support his theories.

Death and cremation 
Adler died suddenly in Aberdeen, Scotland, in May 1937, during a three-week visit to the University of Aberdeen. While walking down the street, he was seen to collapse and lie motionless on the pavement. As a man ran over to him and loosened his collar, Adler mumbled "Kurt", the name of his son, and died. The autopsy performed determined his death was caused by a degeneration of the heart muscle. His body was cremated at Warriston Crematorium in Edinburgh but the ashes were never reclaimed. In 2007, his ashes were rediscovered in a casket at Warriston Crematorium and returned to Vienna for burial in 2011.

Use of Adler's work without attribution
Much of Adler's theories have been absorbed into modern psychology without attribution. Psychohistorian Henri F. Ellenberger writes, "It would not be easy to find another author from which so much has been borrowed on all sides without acknowledgement than Alfred Adler." Ellenberger posits several theories for "the discrepancy between greatness of achievement, massive rejection of person and work, and wide-scale, quiet plagiarism..." These include Adler's "imperfect" style of writing and demeanor, his "capacity to create a new obviousness," and his lack of a large and well organized following.

Influence on depth psychology
In collaboration with Sigmund Freud and a small group of Freud's colleagues, Adler was among the co-founders of the psychoanalytic movement and a core member of the Vienna Psychoanalytic Society: indeed, to Freud he was "the only personality there". He was the first major figure to break away from psychoanalysis to form an independent school of psychotherapy and personality theory, which he called individual psychology because he believed a human to be an indivisible whole, an individuum. He also imagined a person to be connected or associated with the surrounding world.

This was after Freud declared Adler's ideas as too contrary, leading to an ultimatum to all members of the Society (which Freud had shepherded) to drop Adler or be expelled, disavowing the right to dissent (Makari, 2008). Nevertheless, Freud always took Adler's ideas seriously, calling them "honorable errors". Though one rejects the content of Adler's views, one can recognize their consistency and significance." Following this split, Adler would come to have an enormous, independent effect on the disciplines of counseling and psychotherapy as they developed over the course of the 20th century (Ellenberger, 1970). He influenced notable figures in subsequent schools of psychotherapy such as Rollo May, Viktor Frankl, Abraham Maslow and Albert Ellis. His writings preceded, and were at times surprisingly consistent with, later Neo-Freudian insights such as those evidenced in the works of Otto Rank, Karen Horney, Harry Stack Sullivan and Erich Fromm, some considering that it would take several decades for Freudian ego psychology to catch up with Adler's ground-breaking approach.

Adler emphasized the importance of equality in preventing various forms of psychopathology, and espoused the development of social interest and democratic family structures for raising children. His most famous concept is the inferiority complex which speaks to the problem of self-esteem and its negative effects on human health (e.g. sometimes producing a paradoxical superiority striving). His emphasis on power dynamics is rooted in the philosophy of Nietzsche, whose works were published a few decades before Adler's. Specifically, Adler's conceptualization of the "Will to Power" focuses on the individual's creative power to change for the better. Adler argued for holism, viewing the individual holistically rather than reductively, the latter being the dominant lens for viewing human psychology.  Adler was also among the first in psychology to argue in favor of feminism, and the female analyst, making the case that power dynamics between men and women (and associations with masculinity and femininity) are crucial to understanding human psychology (Connell, 1995). Adler is considered, along with Freud and Jung, to be one of the three founding figures of depth psychology, which emphasizes the unconscious and psychodynamics (Ellenberger, 1970; Ehrenwald, 1991); and thus to be one of the three great psychologists/philosophers of the twentieth century.

Personal life 
During his college years, he had become attached to a group of socialist students, among which he had found his wife-to-be, Raissa Timofeyewna Epstein, an intellectual and social activist from Russia studying in Vienna. Because Raissa was a militant socialist, she had a large impact on Adler's early publications and ultimately his theory of personality. They married in 1897 and had four children, two of whom, his daughter Alexandra and his son Kurt, became psychiatrists. Their children were writer, psychiatrist and Socialist activist Alexandra Adler; psychiatrist Kurt Adler; writer and activist Valentine Adler; and Cornelia "Nelly" Adler. Raissa, Adler's wife, died at 89 in New York City on April 21, 1962.

Author and journalist Margot Adler (1946-2014) was Adler's granddaughter.

Artistic and cultural references 
The two main characters in the novel Plant Teacher engage in a session of Adlerian lifestyle interpretation, including early memory interpretation.

In the episode Something About Dr. Mary of the television series Frasier, Frasier recalls having to "pass under a dangerously unbalanced portrait of Alfred Adler" during his studies at Harvard.

He appears as a character in the Young Indiana Jones Chronicles.

English-language Adlerian journals

North America
 The Journal of Individual Psychology (University of Texas Press)
 The Canadian Journal of Adlerian Psychology (Adlerian Psychology Association of British Columbia)

United Kingdom
 Adlerian Yearbook (Adlerian Society, UK)

Publications 
Alfred Adler's key publications were The Practice and Theory of Individual Psychology (1924), Understanding Human Nature (1927), & What Life Could Mean to You (1931). Other important publications are The Pattern of Life (1930), The Science of Living (1930), The Neurotic Constitution (1917), The Problems of Neurosis (1930). In his lifetime, Adler published more than 300 books and articles.

The Alfred Adler Institute of Northwestern Washington has recently published a twelve-volume set of The Collected Clinical Works of Alfred Adler, covering his writings from 1898 to 1937. An entirely new translation of Adler's magnum opus, The Neurotic Character, is featured in Volume 1. Volume 12 provides comprehensive overviews of Adler's mature theory and contemporary Adlerian practice.
 Volume 1 :  The Neurotic Character — 1907
 Volume 2 :  Journal Articles 1898–1909
 Volume 3 :  Journal Articles 1910–1913
 Volume 4 :  Journal Articles 1914–1920
 Volume 5 :  Journal Articles 1921–1926
 Volume 6 :  Journal Articles 1927–1931
 Volume 7 :  Journal Articles 1931–1937
 Volume 8 :  Lectures to Physicians & Medical Students
 Volume 9 :  Case Histories
 Volume 10 :  Case Readings & Demonstrations
 Volume 11 :  Education for Prevention
 Volume 12 :  The General System of Individual Psychology

Other key Adlerian texts 
 Adler, A. (1964). The Individual Psychology of Alfred Adler. H. L. Ansbacher and R. R. Ansbacher (Eds.). New York: Harper Torchbooks. .
 Adler, A. (1979). Superiority and Social Interest: A Collection of Later Writings. H. L. Ansbacher and R. R. Ansbacher (Eds.). New York, NY:  W. W. Norton. .

See also 
 Adlerian
 Classical Adlerian psychology
 Neo-Adlerian

Notes

References 
 Adler, A. (1908). Der Aggressionstrieb im Leben und der Neurose. Fortsch. Med.  26: 577–584.
Adler, A. (1938). Social Interest: A Challenge to Mankind. J. Linton and R. Vaughan (Trans.). London: Faber and Faber Ltd.
 Adler, A. (1956). The Individual Psychology of Alfred Adler. H. L. Ansbacher and R. R. Ansbacher (Eds.). New York: Harper Torchbooks.
 Connell, R. W. (1995). Masculinities. Cambridge, UK: Polity Press.
 Dreikurs, R. & Soltz, V. (1964). Children the Challenge. New York: Hawthorn Books.
 Ehrenwald, J. (1991, 1976). The History of Psychotherapy: From healing magic to encounter. Northvale, NJ: Jason Aronson Inc. 
Eissler, K.R. (1971). Death Drive, Ambivalence, and Narcissism. Psychoanal. St. Child, 26: 25–78.
 Ellenberger, H. (1970). The Discovery of the Unconscious. New York: Basic Books.
 Fiebert, M. S. (1997). In and out of Freud's shadow: A chronology of Adler's relationship with Freud. Individual Psychology, 53(3), 241–269.
Freud, S. (1909). Analysis of a Phobia in a Five-Year-Old Boy. Standard Edition of the Works of Sigmund Freud, London: Hogarth Press, Vol. 10, pp. 3–149.
 Gantschacher, H. (ARBOS 2007). Witness and Victim of the Apocalypse, chapter 13 page 12 and chapter 14 page 6.
 King, R. & Shelley, C. (2008). Community Feeling and Social Interest: Adlerian Parallels, Synergy, and Differences with the Field of Community Psychology. Journal of Community and Applied Social Psychology, 18, 96–107.
 Manaster, G. J., Painter, G., Deutsch, D., & Overholt, B. J. (Eds.). (1977). Alfred Adler: As We Remember Him. Chicago: North American Society of Adlerian Psychology.
 Orgler, H. (1996). Alfred Adler, 22 (1), pg. 67–68.
 Shelley, C. (Ed.). (1998). Contemporary Perspectives on Psychotherapy and Homosexualities. London: Free Association Books.
 Slavik, S. & King, R. (2007). Adlerian therapeutic strategy. The Canadian Journal of Adlerian Psychology, 37(1), 3–16.

Further reading 
 Phyllis Bottome (1939). Alfred Adler: A Biography. G. P. Putnam's Sons. New York.
 Phyllis Bottome (1939). Alfred Adler: Apostle of Freedom. London: Faber and Faber. 3rd Ed. 1957.
 Carlson, J., Watts, R. E., & Maniacci, M. (2005). Adlerian Therapy: Theory and Practice. Washington, DC: American Psychological Association. .
 Dinkmeyer, D. Sr., & Dreikurs, R. (2000). Encouraging Children to Learn. Philadelphia: Brunner-Routledge. .
 Rudolf Dreikurs (1935): An Introduction to Individual Psychology. London: Kegan Paul, Trench Trubner & Co. Ltd. (new edition 1983: London & New York: Routledge), .
 Grey, L. (1998). Alfred Adler: The Forgotten Prophet: A Vision for the 21st Century. Westport, CT: Praeger. .
 Handlbauer, B. (1998). The Freud-Adler Controversy. Oxford, UK: Oneworld. .
 Hoffman, E. (1994). The Drive for Self: Alfred Adler and the Founding of Individual Psychology. New York: Addison-Wesley Co. .
 Lehrer, R. (1999). "Adler and Nietzsche". In: J. Golomb, W. Santaniello, and R. Lehrer. (Eds.). Nietzsche and Depth Psychology. (pp. 229–246). Albany, NY: State University of New York Press. .
 Mosak, H. H. & Di Pietro, R. (2005). Early Recollections: Interpretive Method and Application. New York: Routledge. .
 Oberst, U. E. and Stewart, A. E. (2003). Adlerian Psychotherapy: An Advanced Approach to Individual Psychology. New York: Brunner-Routledge. .
 Orgler, H. (1963). Alfred Adler: The Man and His Work: Triumph Over the Inferiority Complex. New York: Liveright.
 Orgler, H. (1996). Alfred Adler, 22 (1), pg. 67–68.
 Josef Rattner (1983): Alfred Adler: Life and Literature. Ungar Pub. Co. .
 Slavik, S. & Carlson, J. (Eds.). (2005). Readings in the Theory of Individual Psychology. New York: Routledge. .
 Manès Sperber (1974). Masks of Loneliness: Alfred Adler in Perspective. New York: Macmillan. .
 Stepansky, P. E. (1983). In Freud's Shadow: Adler in Context. Hillsdale, NJ: Analytic Press. .
 Watts, R. E. (2003). Adlerian, cognitive, and constructivist therapies: An integrative dialogue. New York: Springer. .
 Watts, R. E., & Carlson, J. (1999). Interventions and strategies in counseling and psychotherapy. New York: Accelerated Development/Routledge. .
 Way, Lewis (1950): Adler's Place in Psychology. London: Allen & Unwin.
 Way, Lewis (1956): Alfred Adler: An Introduction to his Psychology. London: Pelican.
 West, G. K. (1975). Kierkegaard and Adler. Tallahassee: Florida State University.

External links 

 
 International Association of Individual Psychology
 Psychology Articles 
 The Adlerian Society (UK) and the Institute for Individual Psychology
 The North American Society of Adlerian Psychology
 Institutul de Psihologie si Psihoterapie Adleriana Romania
 Centro de Estudios Adlerianos Uruguay
 Classical Adlerian Psychology according to Alfred Adlers Institutes in San Francisco and Northwestern Washington
 AdlerPedia
 Hong Kong Society of Adlerian Psychology
 New Concept Coaching & Training Institute
 

1870 births
1937 deaths
Adler family
Adlerian psychology
19th-century Austrian Jews
Austrian socialists
Jewish scientists
Austrian ophthalmologists
Austrian people of Hungarian-Jewish descent
Austrian psychiatrists
Austrian psychologists
Jewish psychiatrists
People from Rudolfsheim-Fünfhaus
University of Vienna alumni